ZmEu is a computer vulnerability scanner which searches for web servers that are open to attack through the phpMyAdmin program,

 It also attempts to guess SSH passwords through brute-force methods, and leaves a persistent backdoor.  It was developed in Romania and was especially common in 2012.

It is apparently named after Zmeu, a dragon-like being in Romanian folklore.

References

Computer security software